BQC or bqc may refer to:

 Beijing Queer Chorus, a semiprofessional mixed choir based in Beijing, China
 Bournvita Quiz Contest, an Indian quiz contest sponsored by Cadbury India
 British Quizzing Championships, a quiz competition in the United Kingdom
 bqc, the ISO 639-3 code for Boko language, Benin and Nigeria